is a cape facing the Pacific Ocean in Muroran City, Hokkaido, Japan.

Overview
Many people come to the cape to see the first sunrise on the new year to see the curvature of the horizon.

Cape Chikiu was placed first in the "100 best natural spots of Hokkaido" list published by  the Asahi Shimbun in 1985. It was also included in the list of "Favorite Hokkaido scenic spots" by the Hokkaido Post Office in 1986 and the "100 new Japan sightseeing spots" by the Yomiuri Shimbun in 1987. Cape Chikiu named "The Etomo peninsula outer Coast" with "Harkaramoi, Masuich beach, Tokkarisho" and designated as a national scenic spot "Pirikanoka" (it means "Beautiful shape" in Ainu people Language) in 2012.

Chikiu Lighthouse was first turned on in 1920, and was selected as one of the "50 lighthouses of Japan". It was also dubbed by the Japan Society of Civil Engineers as part of the country's "civil engineering heritage".

Green space of Cape Chkiu
Area from Cape Chikiu to Charatsunay where is located on west side where is a green area of about fifty hectares based on urban planning and has a walking path. You can see flowers such as Katakuri, Ezokawaranadeshiko, Ōbaki violet in the spring. The surrounding area is on a migratory birds route and is also known as Peregrine falcon nesting site for aim migratory birds. In addition, woodpeckers and other wild birds can be observed, so citizen bird-watching event is held. The waterway which is located almost in the center of the green space is a valuable place for breeding of Hokkaido salamanders.

Facilities

Observatory
Restrooms
Stands
Parking lot

Access

From Bokoi Station on the JR Hokkaido Muroran Main Line take the Donan Bus bound for Cape Chikiu housing complex and get off there.

References

Headlands of Japan
Muroran, Hokkaido